Surya Prakash or Suryaprakash may refer to:

 G. K. Surya Prakash (born 1953), professor of chemistry, University of Southern California, United States
 P. Surya Prakash (fl. 2007–2014), bishop, Church of South India, Diocese of Karimnagar, India
 R. Suryaprakash (fl. 1991–2013), Carnatic vocalist
 Surya Prakash (director) (fl. 1996–2015), Indian film director
 Surya Prakash Chaturvedi (born 1937), cricket critic, writer and historian 
 Surya Prakash (artist) (1940–2019)